Unni Menon (born 2 December 1955) is an Indian film playback singer. He has recorded over 4000 songs in many Indian languages including Malayalam, Tamil, Telugu and Kannada. In the early part of his career, he spent many years as a low-profile playback singer. The turning point in his career came with the song "Pudhu Vellai Mazhai" from Mani Ratnam's award-winning 1992 Tamil film Roja, composed by A. R. Rahman. He has frequently associated with A. R. Rahman, lending his voice to nearly 27 popular songs from films like Karuththamma (1994) and Minsaara Kanavu (1997).

Early life

Menon was born in Valanchery in the Malappuram district of Kerala to V.K.S Menon and Malathy. His father was an officer in Tamil Nadu police and a native of Guruvayoor in Thrissur district. He did his schooling at Basel Evangelical Mission Higher Secondary School, Palakkad. Later, he attended the Government Victoria College, Palakkad, from where he graduated with a degree in Physics. He exhibited great talent and enthusiasm for music in childhood, winning many prizes in competitions throughout his school and college days.

Career

Unni Menon is a Malayalam film playback singer. Kunjunni, a violinist for music director Ilaiyaraaja introduced him to B. A. Chidambaranath, a music director, and Unni's musical career was launched in 1981–82. His maiden song "Amudhum Thenum" was never released, but with "Pon maane kobam eno" he became a noted singer in 1984. He was a track singer and after listening to his tracks for the film, Kadathu, KJ Yesudas asked to the music director, Shyam, to make it straight.  And after the huge success of the Kadathu songs ("Olangal Thaalam Thullumbol", "Punnaare Poonthinkale", etc.), Unni became a regular singer for the hit music director, Shyam. Shyam has given him a good number of popular songs like "Maanathe Hoori Pole" (Ee Naadu), "Valakilukkam Oru Valakilukkam" (Munnettam), "Kaayampoo Korthu Tharum" (Aarorumariyaathe) and "Thozhuthu Madangum Sandhyayumetho" (Aksharangal). After Shyam's decline from the film music field, Unni's career in Malayalam film musicdom also went into shades.  During that period, he has given some hit private albums such as Raagageethi and Raaga Lahari, with his contemporary playback singer, Ashalatha.Paanchajanyam a Hindu devotional audio album on Lord Guruvayurappan brought him a lot of fame in the Malayalam audio world.

Unni Menon moved to Chennai (then Madras) where he had a job in the Heavy Vehicles Factory at Avadi. Many of the prominent recording studios of South India were located in Chennai. His interest in music led him to visit these studios regularly and formed acquaintances with many prominent artists like the singer K. J. Yesudas and composer Ilayaraaja. Soon he had graduated from singing tracks for prominent singers and was becoming a singer sought after by many music directors.

In 1980s he had few lone hits, "Pon maane kobam eno" in Tamil film 'Oru kaidhiyin dairy', with a nickname Vijay, singing for Ilayaraja. His career got a major boost in 1992 when A. R. Rahman offered him the song "Puthu Vellai Mazhai". That song went on to become a huge hit, as were all the other songs from the film. Since then he has sung many songs which have become big hits.

In 2003, Unni Menon added a new dimension to his career when he acted and composed music for the Malayalam film Sthithi besides singing the songs in the film.

Unni menon is the leading Singer in 2009 Malayalam Devotional Album Saranamanthram directed by Kamalan

Awards

Tamil Nadu State Film Awards:
 2002 – Best Male Playback Singer – Varushamellam Vasantham (Song: "Enge Antha Vennila") and Unnai Ninaithu (Songs: "Ennai Thalatum" and "Yaarindha Devathai")
 1996 – Best Male Playback Singer – Minsara Kanavu  (Song: "Ooh lalala")

Film Guidance Society of Kerala Film Awards:
 2011  – Best Male Playback Singer – Beautiful (Song: "Mazhaneer Thullikal")

North American Film Awards
 2017 - Best Male Playback Singer – Jacobinte Swargarajyam 
Kalaimamani Honour by Tamil Nadu Government
2018 - Contribution to Playback singing

Partial filmography
List of tamil songs recorded by Unni Menon

 Kadathu (1981)
 Munnettam (1981)
 Thenum Vayambum (1981)
 Paanchajanyam (1982)
 Palangal (1982)
 Ee Naadu (1982)
 John Jaffer Janardhanan (1982)
 Kolakomban (1983)
 Himam (1983)
 Iniyenkilum (1983)
 Bhookambam (1983)
 Belt Mathai (1983)
 Sandyakenthinu Sindooram (1984)
 Umanilayam (1984)
 Aksharangal (1984)
 Koottinlamkili (1984)
 Aarorumariyathe (1984)
 Angadikkapurattu (1985)
 Vannu kandu Keezhadakki (1985)
 Shantham Bheekaram (1985)
 Vellarikka Pattanam (1985)
 Boeing Boeing (1985)
 Adhyayam Onnu Muthal (1985)
 Oru Nokku Kanan (1985)
 Ee Lokam Ivide Kure Manushyar (1985)
 Kandu Kandarinju (1985)
 Chekkeran oru Chilla(1986)
 Gandhinagar 2nd Street(1986)
 Ennu Nadhante Nimmi (Song :"Poove Arimullapoove") (1986)
 Rajavinte Makan (1986)
 Ithile Iniyum Varu (1986)
 Kshamichu Ennoru Vakku (1986)
 Snehamulla Simham (1986)
 Nyayavidhi (1986)
 Shyama (1986)
 Vazhiyorakkazhchakal (1987)
 Sruthi (1987)
 Ramji Rao Speaking (1989)
 Naaduvazhikal (1989)
 Carnival (1989)
 In Harihar Nagar (1990)
 Pavakoothu (1990)
 Kuttettan (1990)
 Akkareakkareakkare (1990)
 God Father (1991)
 Mimics Parade (1991)
 Roja (1992)
 Pudhiya Mugam (1993)
 Thiruda Thiruda (1993) (in Tamil and Telugu)
 Puthupatty Ponnuthayee (1994) (Tamil)
 Karuththamma (1994) (In Tamil and Telugu)
 Tom & Jerry (1995)
 Mr. Romeo (1996)
 Minsaara Kanavu (1997)
 Uyire (1998)
 Kadhalar Dhinam (1999)
 Rhythm (2000)
  Jodi (1999)
 Star (2001)
 Shahjahan (2001)
 Varushamellam Vasantham (2002)
 Unnai Ninaithu (2002)
 Bala (2002)
 Enakku 20 Unakku 18 (2003) (in Tamil and Telugu)
 Mullavalliyum Thenmavum (2003)
 Kangalal Kaithu Sei (2004)
 The Legend (2022)

Telugu discography

Malayalam album songs
 Pranayamarmaram – 2009.
 Aavani Kanavukal - 1997
 Chingakili - 1992
 Ponnavanni Pattukal - 2017
 Eenathil - 2018

References

External links
 Official Website
 

1955 births
Living people
Indian male playback singers
Tamil playback singers
Malayalam playback singers
People from Thrissur district
Tamil Nadu State Film Awards winners
Government Victoria College, Palakkad alumni
Singers from Kerala
Film musicians from Kerala
20th-century Indian singers
21st-century Indian singers
20th-century Indian male singers
21st-century Indian male singers